Nu wij niet meer praten is song of Dutch singer Jaap Reesema in collaboration with Belgian actress and singer Pommelien Thijs. It became a number one song in the Dutch Top 40 and Belgian Ultratop 50.

References

2021 songs
Dutch Top 40 number-one singles
Ultratop 50 Singles (Flanders) number-one singles